Eric George Adelberger (born June 26, 1938 in Bryn Mawr, Pennsylvania) is an American experimental nuclear physicist and gravitational metrologist.

Biography
He graduated from Washington-Lee High School (now known as Washington-Liberty High School), and then matriculated at California Institute of Technology (Caltech), where he was inspired by Richard Feynman. At Caltech Adelberger graduated in 1960 with a B.S. and in 1967 with a Ph.D. under the supervision of Charles A. Barnes (1921–2015). As a postdoc Adelberger was from 1967 to 1968 a research fellow at Caltech and from 1968 to 1969 a research associate at Stanford University. From 1969 to 1971 he was an assistant professor at Princeton University. At Seattle's University of Washington, he was from 1971 to 1972 an assistant professor, from 1972 to 1975 an associate professor, and from 1975 to 2007 a full professor, retiring in 2007 as professor emeritus. From 1978 to 1981 he was an associate editor for Physical Review Letters.

His research deals with experimental nuclear physics (including fundamental symmetries in nuclei and nuclear structure) and experimental gravitational physics.

In the University of Washington's Eöt-wash Group, he has investigated the validity of Newton's law of gravitation down to small distances, smaller than the previously tested minimum distances in the mm range. In 2007, the group was able to rule out extra dimensions larger than 44 microns and hopes to be able to continue the experiment down to a few microns. With an improved torsion balance they also tested the equivalence principle for various substances and distances from 1 m to very large distances (from planet Earth to the centre of the Milky Way). They set new precision records in 2006 and 2008 for the Eötvös parameter with an accuracy that was not improved until the MICROSCOPE orbital satellite experiment in 2017.

In 1982 he received the Humboldt Senior Scientist Award. In 1985 he received the Tom W. Bonner Prize in Nuclear Physics for "his outstanding contributions in using nuclei to study fundamental symmetries, particularly studies of parity violation and isospin mixing."  In 2021 he was awarded, jointly with Blayne Heckel and Jens H. Gundlach, the Breakthrough Prize in Fundamental Physics for “precision fundamental measurements that test our understanding of gravity, probe the nature of dark energy, and establish limits on couplings to dark matter."

Adelberger was elected in 1978 a fellow of the American Physical Society (APS), in 1994 a member of the National Academy of Sciences, and in 1998 a fellow of the American Academy of Arts and Sciences.

In August 1961 in Arlington, Virginia, he married Audra Elizabeth Browman. They have two children. Eric and Audra Adelberger have often backpacked and kayaked together and are long-time supporters of The Wilderness Society and The Nature Conservancy.

Selected publications
 
 
  (over 900 citations)
 
  (over 900 citations)
 
  (over 800 citations)

References

External links
 
 
  (slides)
 
 
 
 
 

1938 births
Living people
California Institute of Technology alumni
University of Washington faculty
Experimental physicists
American nuclear physicists
20th-century American physicists
21st-century American physicists
Metrologists
Fellows of the American Physical Society
Fellows of the American Academy of Arts and Sciences
Members of the United States National Academy of Sciences
American people of German descent
California Institute of Technology fellows